Nasavrky is a town in Chrudim District in the Pardubice Region of the Czech Republic. It has about 1,700 inhabitants.

Administrative parts
Villages of Březovec, Drahotice, Libáň, Nová Ves, Obořice, Ochoz and Podlíšťany are administrative parts of Nasavrky.

References

External links

Populated places in Chrudim District
Cities and towns in the Czech Republic